NET Television may refer to the following:

ERT2, a Greek public broadcaster formerly known as Néa Ellinikí Tileórasi ("New Hellenic Television")
Nebraska Educational Telecommunications, a public broadcasting network in Nebraska, United States
NET Television (Malta), a television station operated by the Nationalist Party in Malta

See also: National Educational Television, a public broadcasting network in the United States from the 1950s - 1970s